KNMT (channel 24) is a religious television station in Portland, Oregon, United States, owned and operated by the Trinity Broadcasting Network (TBN). The station's transmitter is located in the Sylvan-Highlands section of the city, near the West Hills of Portland.

KNMT's studios, once located on Northeast 74th Avenue in Portland, were sold to a developer to become low income housing.

History 
KNMT was founded on June 7, 1985, and began broadcasting operations on November 16, 1989; it was Portland's first full-power, full-service religious broadcast station. The station primarily carries programming from the TBN satellite feed, but also produces and broadcasts locally produced programs such as the religious program Northwest Praise the Lord (a local version of TBN's flagship program Praise the Lord) and the public affairs show Northwest Focus.

The station was formerly owned by National Minority Television (hence its call letters), a de facto subsidiary of TBN that was used by the network to circumvent the Federal Communications Commission (FCC)'s television station ownership restrictions. While TBN founder Paul Crouch was NMTV's president, one of its directors was African American and the other was Latino, which met the FCC's definition of a "minority-controlled" firm. In mid-2008, the station and its NMTV sisters came directly under TBN ownership.

As of 2019, only KNMT-DT1 and the satellite feed of Enlace are carried by Comcast locally.

Subchannels
 The station's digital signal remained on its pre-transition UHF channel 45 (although it was originally slated to move its digital signal to UHF channel 24), using PSIP to display the station's virtual channel as its former UHF analog channel 24.

References

External links 
 

Trinity Broadcasting Network affiliates
Television channels and stations established in 1989
NMT
1989 establishments in Oregon